Transeast Airlines was an airline based in Riga, Latvia. Its main base was Riga International Airport, and it started operating scheduled services between Riga and Jönköping, Sweden in May 1993, and between Riga and Billund, Denmark in March 1995. It ceased its operations in 2001.

Fleet 
The Transeast Airlines fleet consisted of Yakovlev Yak-40 aircraft.

External links 
Transeast Airlines

Defunct airlines of Latvia
Airlines established in 1993
Airlines disestablished in 2001
Latvian companies established in 1993
2001 disestablishments in Latvia